Telekia is a genus of flowering plant, of the family Asteraceae.

 Species
 Telekia speciosa (Schreb.) Baumg. - Europe + southwest Asia from France and Great Britain to Caucasus
 Telekia speciosissima DC. 1836 conserved name, not (L.) Less. 1832 - Lombardy region of Italy

 formerly included
 Telekia africana Hook.f. - Anisopappus chinensis subsp. africanus (Hook.f.) S.Ortiz & Paiva
 Telekia speciosissima (L.) Less. 1832, not DC. 1836 - Xerolekia speciosissima (L.) Anderb.

References

Asteraceae genera
Inuleae